The Oakland Interfaith Gospel Choir (OIGC) is located in Oakland, California, US.
It was founded in 1986 as an outgrowth of a gospel music workshop, and became an independent organization in 1991. The choir has since toured globally, produced multiple CDs and appeared in films and on television. The choir's repertoire is diverse, and OIGC has collaborated with a variety of pop artists from different genres, including gospel, jazz, and hip-hop.

Founded in 1986, the Oakland Interfaith Gospel Choir was born out of a gospel music workshop led by Terrance Kelly at Living Jazz’s Jazz Camp West. It became an independent nonprofit organization in 1991. Since then, the Choir’s harmonies and gospel repertoire have led to performances with a variety of groups, such as Joshua Nelson, the Prince of Kosher Gospel; the Five Blind Boys of Alabama; and the Duke Ellington Orchestra. The Choir also appears on albums by Linda Ronstadt, MC Hammer, Tramaine Hawkins, and others.

In addition, OIGC supports a youth choir. Started in 1997, they perform at a wide variety of local and other events. The choir provides musical, educational, and social opportunities for Bay Area youth, as well as the chance for mentoring and scholarships.

The latest arm of the OIGC family is the Community Choir, which was established in 2013. In less than two years, this choir has grown to over 70 members. A non-auditioned choir, OICC meets once a month and performs several times throughout the year, including their summer gospel concert.

See also
The choir has inspired other choirs, such as the Arcata Interfaith Gospel Choir, to form.

This choir also has a youth portion.

A documentary film was made about the choir in 2018, called "One Voice: The Story of the Oakland Interfaith Gospel Choir". It premiered at the Mill Valley Film Festival and was featured on KQED's "Truly CA" series in 2020. One Voice was directed by Spencer Wilkinson of Endangered Ideas.

Recordings
Self-Produced

The Oakland Interfaith Gospel Choir—Live!, Oakland Interfaith Gospel Choir, 1991.

We’ve Come a Mighty Long Way, Oakland Interfaith Gospel Choir, 1995.

Rejoice! Christmas with the Oakland Interfaith Gospel Choir, Oakland Interfaith Gospel Choir, 1999.

Great Day: A Cappella Negro Spirituals, Oakland Interfaith Gospel Choir, 2003.

Hear My Prayer, Oakland Interfaith Gospel Choir, 2011.

Appears on:

Kronos Quartet, Pieces of Africa, Nonesuch, 1992

Hammer, Too Legit To Quit, Emd/Capitol, 1991.

Tramaine Hawkins, Tramaine—Live, Sparrow Records, 1990.

Linda Ronstadt, Cry Like a Rainstorm, Howl Like the Wind, Wea/Elektra Entertainment, 1989.

Notes

External links
OIGC Home Page

Choirs in California
Musical groups from Oakland, California
Musical groups established in 1986
1986 establishments in California